Jader may refer to:

People

Given name
 Jader Barbalho (born 1944), Brazilian politician and businessman
 Jader Bignamini (born 1976), Italian conductor and clarinetist
 Jader Souza (born 1982), Brazilian swimmer
 Jader (footballer, born 1984), Jader da Silva Brazeiro, Brazilian football midfielder
 Jáder Obrian (born 1995), Colombian football attacking midfielder
 Jader Valencia (born 1999), Colombian football forward
 Jader (footballer, born 2003), Jader Barbosa da Silva Gentil, Brazilian football forward

Surname
 Khalid al-Jader (1922-1988), Iraqi artist, administrator and author
 Bernard Jąder (born 1951), Polish speedway rider
 Stig Jäder (born 1954), Swedish cross country skier

Places
 Jäder Church, Swedish church